Tetsuya Tanaka may refer to:

Tetsuya Tanaka (racing driver) (born 1965), Japanese racing driver
Tetsuya Tanaka (footballer) (born 1971), Japanese football player